Dyspessa ariadne is a moth in the family Cossidae. It was described by Yakovlev in 2008. It is found in Iran.

The length of the forewings is 10–11 mm. The forewings are uniform light-yellow in males. The hindwings have a brown-grey suffusion. Females are much darker with a greatly reduced light pattern.

References

Natural History Museum Lepidoptera generic names catalog

Moths described in 2008
Dyspessa
Moths of Asia